Ersan Özseven (born August 23, 1983 in İstanbul) is a Turkish professional basketball player who plays for KB RTV 21 in Kosovo. He 6 ft 6 in (2.01 m) tall and he weighs 201 lb (91 kg).

He also played for Oyak Renault, Pinar KSK, Mersin BSB and Aliağa Petkim in Turkey.

External links
TBLStat.net Profile

References 

1983 births
Living people
Aliağa Petkim basketball players
Karşıyaka basketball players
Mersin Büyükşehir Belediyesi S.K. players
Oyak Renault basketball players
Basketball players from Istanbul
Turkish men's basketball players
Small forwards
Turkish expatriate basketball people in Kosovo